The peacock dance or peafowl dance is a traditional Asian folk dance that describes the beauty and the movement of peacocks. There are several peacock dance traditions developed in Asia, among others are peacock dances of Myanmar, and in the western and northern parts of Cambodia, West Java in Indonesia, also peacock dances of Indian subcontinent in Southern India, Sri Lanka, and Bangladesh.

China
Peacock as a totem of the Dai people in the southwestern Chinese province Yunnan, one of the 56 ethnic groups in China, is an essential part of the cultural and spiritual aspects of the Dai people. The peacock dance as the most famous and traditional performance dance among the folk dances of the Dai people is prevalent in Ruili, Luxi located in Dehong Dai and Jingpo Autonomous Prefecture, Mengding, Mengda, Jinggu Dai and Yi Autonomous County, Cangyuan Va Autonomous County and other inhabitation regions of the Dai People.

The peacock dance of the Dai ethnic group has a very long history and is closely tied with their distinguished ethnic culture. Any festival occasion or celebration such as the annual Water Festival and the Gate Closing / Opening Festival is accompanied by the peacock dance, to express joy and happiness.

In general, there are two different kinds of the traditional peacock dance of the Dai ethic group in China. One is the peacock dance with the wearing of heavy stand made of bamboo, silk and other materials that imitates the stretching feather of a peacock. One single stand can weigh up to 20 kilos and will be attached to the back and waist area of the performer. The other is the "unarmed peacock dance". Performers do not need to carry any heavy stand. Elephant-foot drums, gongs and cymbals are the usual accompanying instruments for the peacock dance.

India

The mayilattam (Tamil: மயிலாட்டம்), also known as peacock dance, is performed by girls dressed as peacocks during the harvest festival of Thai Pongal in the Indian states of Tamil Nadu and Kerala.

Indonesia

In Indonesia it is known as the peafowl dance (Merak dance or Tari Merak) and originated in West Java. It is performed by female dancers inspired by the movements of a peacock and its feathers blended with the classical movements of Sundanese dance. its one of new creation dance composed by Sundanese artist and choreographer Raden Tjeje Soemantri around the 1950s. This dance is performed to welcome honourable guest in a big event also occasionally performed in Sundanese wedding ceremonies. This dance is also one of Indonesia's dances performed in many international events, such as in Perahara festivals in Sri Lanka.

Gallery

See also
Dance in Cambodia
Dance in China
Dance in India
Dance in Indonesia
 Sundanese dance

References

Cambodian dances
Chinese culture
Dances of China
Dances of Java
Asian dances
Social dance
Sundanese culture
Tamil dance styles